The Jurca MJ-5 Sirocco (named for the Sirocco wind)  is a two-seat sport aircraft designed in France in the early 1960s and marketed for homebuilding. It is one of many wooden homebuilt designs from Romanian born designer Marcel Jurca. Jurca, a Henschel Hs 129 pilot in World War II marketed the plans in Canada and America through Falconar Aviation. It is a low-wing cantilever monoplane of conventional configuration and wooden construction throughout. The tandem seats are enclosed by a bubble canopy, and the tailwheel undercarriage can be built as either fixed or with retractable main units. Marcel Jurca died on 19 October 2001, at which time plans were still available from the designer's web site.

Plans are supplied by Avions Marcel Jurca and Manna Aviation of Australia.

Variants

MJ-5
Basic variant
The type of engine fitted, and the type of landing gear, are indicated by suffixes to the designation. For example MJ-5K2.
A -  Continental C90-8 or -14F
B -  Continental O-200-A
C -  Potez 4 E-20
D -  Lycoming O-235
E -  Lycoming O-290
EA -  Walter
F -  Continental
G -  Lycoming O-320
H -  Lycoming O-320
J -  Franklin
K -  Lycoming O-360
L -  Lycoming O-360
M -  Franklin:
1 - Fixed landing gear, 2 - retractable landing gear
MJ-50 Windy
All-metal version with retractable landing gear (never built)
MJ-51 Sperocco
("Special Sirocco") - performance version with wing taken from the Jurca Gnatsum
MJ-52 Zéphyr
() - utility version with converted Volkswagen automotive engine or Continental A65
MJ-53 Autan
() - version with side-by-side seating - two built
MJ-55 Biso
() - aerobatic version with the wings of the Jurca Gnatsum without flaps. It had a smaller tail and a fixed aluminium blade landing gear. Only one was built, with a  Lycoming engine. First flown in 1998, it crashed in 2000 due to gluing errors in construction.

Specifications (MJ-5D)

References

 
 
 
 Sirocco on designer's website
 pilotfriend.com

External links

Avions Marcel Jurca website
Manna Aviation website

1960s French sport aircraft
Homebuilt aircraft
Jurca aircraft
Single-engined tractor aircraft
Low-wing aircraft
Aircraft first flown in 1962